The Darwin Rise is broad triangular region in the north central Pacific Ocean where there is a concentration of atolls.

During his voyage across the globe Charles Darwin realised that vertical crustal motion must be responsible for the formation of continents and ocean basins, as well as isolated atolls in the Pacific.  He deduced that the central basin of the Pacific had subsided while surrounding areas had risen.  In 1964 U.S. geologist Henry Menard subsequently named the uplifted area in the Pacific after the English naturalist.

Geological context
Two major plateaux, the Shatsky Rise to the north and the Ontong Java Plateau to the south, border the Darwin Rise.  How these plateaux relate to the rise remains disputed.

There are six major chains of seamounts on the rise — the Japanese, Magellan, Wake, Marshall Islands, Line Islands seamounts and the Mid-Pacific Mountains — and numerous minor clusters.  The ages of these seamounts in general follow the motion of the Pacific Plate from 130 to 180 , as predicted by conventional hotspot theory, and decrease from west to east and north to south.  This age-distance pattern is, however, not corroborated by the limited data available.

Origin
In 1964, Henry Menard proposed that this was a superswell raised by volcanism during the Cretaceous (120-80 mya).  A problem with this conjecture is that this region actually has a sea floor at a normal depth that happens to possess an abundance of sea mounts.

Instead this feature may have formed from diapirs or plumes rising from the Earth's upper mantle, which results in chains of sea mounts along the direction of the plate motion. However, this idea remains in dispute and an alternate hypothesis involving multiple "plumelets" has been proposed.

In the 1980s it was proposed that the Darwin Rise was the South Pacific Superswell 100 Ma and that the volcanoes of the Darwin Rise erupted over the same mantle region as the volcanoes of French Polynesia today.  Hence, U.S. geologist Marcia McNutt proposed that the Darwin Rise is a palaeo-superswell.

See also
 Geology of the Pacific Ocean
 Magellan Rise (ocean plateau)

References

Notes

Sources
 
 
 
 
 
 
 
 

Underwater ridges of the Pacific Ocean